Rigby may refer to:

People
Amy Rigby (born 1959), American singer-songwriter
Beth Rigby (born 1976), British journalist 
Bob Rigby (born 1951), American soccer goalkeeper
Cam Rigby (born 1978), Australian basketball player
Cathy Rigby (born 1952), American gymnast and actress
Claude Rigby (1882–1960), Irish cricketer and radiologist
Elizabeth Rigby, (1809–1893) later Lady Elizabeth Eastlake, British art historian
Emma Rigby (born 1989), English actress
Hannah Rigby (1794–1853), Australian convict
Jean Rigby (born 1954), English opera and concert singer
John Rigby (artist) (1922–2012), Australian artist
John Rigby (martyr) (died 1600), English Catholic martyr
John Rigby (mathematician) (1933–2014), English mathematician and academic
John Rigby (rower) (1906–1975), New Zealand rower
Sir John Rigby (politician) (1834–1903), British lawyer and politician
Jonathan Rigby (born 1963), English film critic and actor
Lee Rigby (1987–2013), British soldier and murder victim
Nicholas Rigby ( 1800–1886), English catholic priest
Norman Rigby (1923–2001), English footballer
Paul Rigby (1924–2006), Australian cartoonist
Sir Peter Rigby (born 1943), British entrepreneur and chairman of SCC
Richard Rigby (1772–1848), British/Irish politician and businessman
Terence Rigby (1937–2008), English actor
Tim Rigby (politician), politician in Ontario, Canada
Tim Rigby (sportscaster), sports anchor for WJAC-TV in Pennsylvania, USA
Will Rigby (born 1956), American drummer and ex-husband of Amy Rigby
William Charles Rigby (1834–1913), Australian bookseller

Places
Rigby, Idaho, U.S.
Rigby High School
Rigby's La Plaza Historic District, Florida, U.S.

Other
.416 Rigby, a rifle cartridge
John Rigby & Company, a manufacturer of firearms
Rigby v Connol, a UK labour law case
A character in the animated television sitcom Regular Show
An imprint of Houghton Mifflin Harcourt
Abbreviation for "Richard is great, but y'know..." used in Silicon Valley (TV series)

See also
 Eleanor Rigby, Beatles song
 Eleanor Rigby (disambiguation)
 Rigsby (disambiguation)
 Rinkeby, a district in Stockholm, Sweden
 

English-language surnames
Danish-language surnames